Table tennis at the 2021 Southeast Asian Games took place at Hải Dương Gymnasium, in Hải Dương, Vietnam from 13 to 20 May 2022.

Participating nations
A total of 53 athletes from seven nations competed in table tennis at the 2021 Southeast Asian Games:

Competition schedule
The following is the competition schedule for the table tennis competitions:

Medalists

Medal table

References

External links
 

 
2021
Southeast Asian Games
Table tennis competitions in Vietnam
2021 Southeast Asian Games events
Hanoi